Frank van der Struijk (born 28 March 1985) is a Dutch professional footballer who plays as a right back or centre back.

Club career
Van der Struijk made his debut in the professional football squad of Willem II in the 2003–04 season. He joined Vitesse Arnhem in 2008 and returned to Willem II on loan in 2010. He later rejoined the club permanently in 2014.

He signed a one-year contract with Scottish club Dundee United in August 2016. He was released by Dundee United when his contract expired at the end of the 2016–17 season.

International career
In 2007 Van der Struijk was called up by Jong Oranje coach Foppe de Haan to be part of his squad for the 2007 UEFA European Under-21 Football Championship where they qualified for the 2008 Summer Olympics. The final was reached with a 1–1, 13–12 win after a penalty shootout with 32 penalty kicks taken against England. The Dutch went on to retain their 2006 title by beating Serbia 4–1 in the final.

Honours
Dundee United
 Scottish Challenge Cup: 2016–17

References

External links
 Voetbal International profile 

1985 births
Living people
People from Boxtel
Association football central defenders
Association football fullbacks
Dutch footballers
Netherlands under-21 international footballers
Netherlands youth international footballers
Eredivisie players
SBV Vitesse players
Willem II (football club) players
Dundee United F.C. players
Dutch expatriate footballers
Dutch expatriate sportspeople in Scotland
Expatriate footballers in Scotland
Footballers from North Brabant